Bob Green or Greene may refer to:

 Bob Green (coach) (born 1950), American football coach
 Bob Green (footballer) (1911–1949), Australian rules footballer
 Bob Green (naturalist) (1925–2013), Australian naturalist and museum curator
 Bob Green (tennis) (born 1960), American tennis player
 Bob Greene (born 1947), American journalist and author
 Bob Greene (fitness) (born 1958), American exercise physiologist
 Bob Greene (Makah) (1918–2010), American Makah elder

See also
 Bobby Green (disambiguation)
 Robert Green (disambiguation)
 Robert Greene (disambiguation)